Following are lists of members of the Australian Senate:
Members of the Australian Senate, 1901–1903 
Members of the Australian Senate, 1904–1906
Members of the Australian Senate, 1907–1910
Members of the Australian Senate, 1910–1913
Members of the Australian Senate, 1913–1914
Members of the Australian Senate, 1914–1917
Members of the Australian Senate, 1917–1920
Members of the Australian Senate, 1920–1923
Members of the Australian Senate, 1923–1926
Members of the Australian Senate, 1926–1929
Members of the Australian Senate, 1929–1932
Members of the Australian Senate, 1932–1935
Members of the Australian Senate, 1935–1938
Members of the Australian Senate, 1938–1941
Members of the Australian Senate, 1941–1944
Members of the Australian Senate, 1944–1947
Members of the Australian Senate, 1947–1950
Members of the Australian Senate, 1950–1951
Members of the Australian Senate, 1951–1953 (terms deemed to have begun 1950)
Members of the Australian Senate, 1953–1956
Members of the Australian Senate, 1956–1959
Members of the Australian Senate, 1959–1962
Members of the Australian Senate, 1962–1965
Members of the Australian Senate, 1965–1968
Members of the Australian Senate, 1968–1971
Members of the Australian Senate, 1971–1974
Members of the Australian Senate, 1974–1975 (terms deemed to have begun 1973)
Members of the Australian Senate, 1975–1978
Members of the Australian Senate, 1978–1981 
Members of the Australian Senate, 1981–1983 
Members of the Australian Senate, 1983–1985 (terms deemed to have begun 1982)
Members of the Australian Senate, 1985–1987 
Members of the Australian Senate, 1987–1990
Members of the Australian Senate, 1990–1993 
Members of the Australian Senate, 1993–1996 
Members of the Australian Senate, 1996–1999 
Members of the Australian Senate, 1999–2002 
Members of the Australian Senate, 2002–2005 
Members of the Australian Senate, 2005–2008
Members of the Australian Senate, 2008–2011
Members of the Australian Senate, 2011–2014 
Members of the Australian Senate, 2014–2016 
Members of the Australian Senate, 2016–2019 (elected 2 July 2016, terms deemed to have begun on 1 July 2016)
Members of the Australian Senate, 2019–2022

 
Australian Senate lists